The Patinoire de Caen la mer (English: Ice rink of Caen la mer) is an ice rink in Caen, France. It is the home arena of the Drakkars de Caen of the Ligue Magnus, and the ACSEL figure skating club. It also offers public access to the ice rink for free skating and lessons.

History
The arena was opened on December 27, 1971. It was renovated in 2000.

Competitions
The 1989 French Figure Skating Championships for singles and pairs were held here.
The 2011 Women's World Ice Hockey Championships – Division II were held here.
The Italian Men's National Ice Hockey Team beat the French National Team in a friendly warmup match for the 2012 Men's World Ice Hockey Championships here.

References

External links
 Official site
 ACSEL official site

Indoor arenas in France
Sports venues in Calvados (department)
Buildings and structures in Caen
Sports venues completed in 1971